Anastasiia Shmonina (born 7 May 2005) is a Ukrainian synchronised swimmer. She is a World champion and multiple European champion. She represents Kharkiv Oblast.

References

External links
 Shmonina's profile at the FINA website

2005 births
Living people
Ukrainian synchronized swimmers
World Aquatics Championships medalists in synchronised swimming
European Aquatics Championships medalists in synchronised swimming
21st-century Ukrainian women